The men's 1500 metre event at the 1928 Olympic Games took place between August 1 & August 2. Forty-four athletes from 19 nations competed. NOCs were limited to 4 competitors each. The event was won by Harri Larva of Finland, the nation's second consecutive victory in the 1500 metres. France won its first medal in the event since 1900, with Jules Ladoumègue's silver matching the nation's best result.

Background

This was the eighth appearance of the event, which is one of 12 athletics events to have been held at every Summer Olympics. Sixth-place finisher Lloyd Hahn of the United States was the only finalist from the 1924 Games to return. Defending champion Paavo Nurmi of Finland was in Amsterdam, but competed only in longer distances this Games. Finland was still well-represented, however, as Eino Purje and Harri Larva were among the favorites, along with Jules Ladoumègue of France and world-record holder Otto Peltzer of Germany.

Argentina and Yugoslavia each made their first appearance in the event. The United States made its eighth appearance, the only nation to have competed in the men's 1500 metres at each Games to that point.

Competition format

The competition consisted of two rounds, the format used since 1908. As in 1924, there were six semifinals, this time with anywhere between 6 and 9 runners in each, and once again the top two runners in each heat advanced to the final, for a 12-man final race.

Records

These were the standing world and Olympic records (in minutes) prior to the 1928 Summer Olympics.

In the final Harri Larva set a new Olympic record at 3:53.2.

Schedule

Results

Semifinals

The top two runners from each of the six heats advanced to the Final Round.

Semifinal 1

Semifinal 2

Semifinal 3

Semifinal 4

Semifinal 5

Semifinal 6

Final

References

Men's 1500 metre
1500 metres at the Olympics
Men's events at the 1928 Summer Olympics